William John Sweeney (born 5 January 1950) is a Scottish composer.

Biography
Born in Glasgow, he attended Knightswood Secondary School. He studied the clarinet and composition at the Royal Scottish Academy of Music and Drama from 1967 to 1970, and at the Royal Academy of Music from 1970 to 1973, where his teachers included Alan Hacker and Harrison Birtwistle. He went on to teach woodwind instruments, and then composition at the University of Glasgow. An early influence was the European avant-garde, particularly Karlheinz Stockhausen, though he returned to tonal composition in the mid-1970s.

His work is strongly influenced by traditional Scottish folk music; in particular, he has utilised the heterophonic style of Gaelic psalm-singing, and the piobaireachd form; he varies melodies through ornamentation, as in traditional pibroch, and in their contour; he modifies instruments' tone-colours through alternative fingerings. He has a strong regard for the music of Leoš Janáček. He has also addressed the reconciliation of classical and traditional music with jazz, using improvisational techniques and sometimes combining the two idioms. He has been influenced by ancient Greek poetry, and Indian and Arab traditions in his use of ostinato and other techniques of varied repetition.

His Sonata for cello and piano (2010) won the 2011 British Composer Award in the "Instrumental Solo or Duo" category.

Selected works

Opera
An Turus, opera in 3 acts, 1997; libretto by Aonghas MacNeacail

Orchestral
Maqam, 1984
Glasgow, 1985
Sunset Song, 1986
Cumha, 1987
Seann Orain, 1989
Air, Strathspey and Reel, 1990
Concerto Grosso, for 9 clarinets, strings and timpani, 1990
St. Blane's Hill, 1991
A Set for the Kingdom, for string orchestra, 1991
October Landscapes, 1993
Birth/Procession, 1993
The Lost Mountain (A-bheinn Air Chall), for wind band, 1996
Sweeney Astray, 1996

Concertante
Ceol-Beag, for cello and orchestra, 1981
An rathad ùr, for saxophone and orchestra, 1989

Chamber music
String Quartet, 1981
Trio for clarinet, viola and piano, 1982
Sonata for viola, marimba and claves, 1985
Sweeney Astray, for 2 clarinets, 1987, or for clarinet and viola, 2003
String Quartet No. 3, 2004–2007
Sonata for cello and piano, 2010
The Ballad of the Cat and the Ram, for violin and piano

Choral
Salm an Fhearainn, 1987
An Seachnadh, 1988
I Will Wait, 1990
Two Lyrics, 1992
Airc an dualchais, 1998

Multimedia
Tantallon! These Lands, This Wall, 2012

Songs
3 Poems from Sangschaw, 1977
The Heights of Macchu Picchu, 1988
El Pueblo, 1989
A Drunk Man Looks at the Thistle, 1992
An Coilltean Ratharsair (The Woods of Raasay), 1993
Seeking Wise Salmon, 1994
All That Came in That One Coracle, 1999

References

Sources
Mackay, Neil. 'William Sweeney's an seachnadh'''. Tempo, new series, no. 188 (Scottish Issue, March 1994): 58.
Morris, Francis J. 'Sweeney, William (John)', Grove Music Online, ed. L. Macy (Accessed 2007-06-07), 
Reid-Baxter, James. 'William Sweeney and the Voice of the People'. Tempo'', new series, no. 188 (Scottish Issue, March 1994): 26–30.

External links
Scottish music centre: William Sweeney

Scottish classical composers
British male classical composers
20th-century classical composers
21st-century classical composers
Scottish opera composers
Male opera composers
Musicians from Glasgow
1950 births
Living people
Alumni of the Royal Academy of Music
20th-century Scottish musicians
20th-century British composers
20th-century British male musicians
21st-century British male musicians